Yahoo! started at Stanford University. It was founded in January 1994 by Jerry Yang and David Filo, who were Electrical Engineering graduate students when they created a website named "Jerry and David's Guide to the World Wide Web". The Guide was a directory of other websites, organized in a hierarchy, as opposed to a searchable index of pages. In April 1994, Jerry and David's Guide to the World Wide Web was renamed "Yahoo!". The word "YAHOO" is a backronym for "Yet Another Hierarchically Organized Oracle" or "Yet Another Hierarchical Officious Oracle." The yahoo.com domain was created on January 18, 1995.

Yahoo! grew rapidly throughout the 1990s and diversified into a web portal, followed by numerous high-profile acquisitions. The company's stock price skyrocketed during the dot-com bubble and closed at an all-time high of US$118.75 in 2000; however, after the dot-com bubble burst, it reached an all-time low of US$8.11 in 2001. Yahoo! formally rejected an acquisition bid from the Microsoft Corporation in 2008. In early 2012, the largest layoff in Yahoo!'s history was completed and 2,000 employees (14 percent of the workforce) lost their jobs.

Carol Bartz replaced co-founder Jerry Yang as CEO in January 2009, but was fired by the board of directors in September 2011; Tim Morse was appointed as interim CEO following Bartz's departure. Former PayPal president Scott Thompson became CEO in January 2012 and after he resigned was replaced by Ross Levinsohn as the company's interim CEO on May 13, 2012. On July 16, former Google executive Marissa Mayer, became the CEO of the company. Most current is Jim Lanzone

Early history (1994–1996)
Upon the April 1994 renaming of Jerry and David's Guide to the World Wide Web to Yahoo!, Yang and Filo said that "Yet Another Hierarchical Officious Oracle" was a suitable backronym for this name, but they insisted they had selected the name because they liked the word's general definition, as in Gulliver's Travels by Jonathan Swift: "rude, unsophisticated, uncouth." Its URL was akebono.stanford.edu/~yahoo.

While the yahoo.com domain was created in January 1995, by the end of 1994 Yahoo! had already received one million hits. Yang and Filo realized their website had massive business potential, and on March 2, 1995, Yahoo! was incorporated.
Yang and Filo sought out the advice of entrepreneur Randy Adams for a recommendation of a venture capital firm and Adams introduced them to Michael Moritz.  On April 5, 1995, Michael Moritz of Sequoia Capital provided Yahoo! with two rounds of venture capital, raising approximately $3 million. On April 12, 1996, Yahoo! had its initial public offering, raising $33.8 million by selling 2.6 million shares at the opening bid of $13 each.

The word "Yahoo" had previously been trademarked for barbecue sauce, knives (by EBSCO Industries) and human propelled watercraft! (by Old Town Canoe Co.). Therefore, in order to get control of the trademark, Yang and Filo added the exclamation mark to the name. However, the exclamation mark is often incorrectly omitted when referring to Yahoo!.

Srinija Srinivasan,  an alumna of Stanford University, was hired as Yahoo!'s fifth employee as  "Ontological Yahoo!" to assist Yang and Filo with organizing the content on the internet.

Growth (1997–1999)
In the late 1990s, Yahoo!, MSN, Lycos, Excite and other web portals were growing rapidly. Web portal providers rushed to acquire companies to expand their range of services, generally with the goal of increasing the time each user stays within the portal.

On March 8, 1997, Yahoo! acquired online communications company Four11. Four11's webmail service, Rocketmail, became Yahoo! Mail. Yahoo! also acquired ClassicGames.com and turned it into Yahoo! Games. Yahoo! then acquired direct marketing company Yoyodyne Entertainment, Inc. on October 12, 1998. In January 1999, Yahoo! acquired web hosting provider GeoCities. Another company Yahoo! took over was eGroups, which became Yahoo! Groups in June 2000. Pager, an instant messaging service that was renamed Yahoo! Messenger a year later.

When acquiring companies, Yahoo! often changed the relevant terms of service. For example, they claimed intellectual property rights for content on their servers, unlike the previous policies of the companies they acquired. As a result, many of the acquisitions were controversial and unpopular with users of the existing services.

Dot-com bubble (2000–2001)
Yahoo! stock doubled in price in the last month of 1999. On January 3, 2000, at the height of the dot-com boom, Yahoo! stock closed at an all-time high of $118.75 a share. Sixteen days later, shares in Yahoo! Japan became the first stock in Japanese history to trade at over ¥100,000,000, reaching a price of 101.4 million yen ($962,140 at that time).

On February 7, 2000, yahoo.com was brought to a halt for a few hours, as the victim of a distributed denial of service attack (DDoS). On the next day, its shares rose about $16, or 4.5 percent as the failure was blamed on hackers rather than on an internal glitch, unlike a fault with eBay earlier that year.

During the dot-com boom, the cable news network CNBC reported that Yahoo! and eBay were discussing a 50/50 merger. Although the merger never materialized, the two companies decided to form a marketing/advertising alliance six years later in 2006.

On June 26, 2000, Yahoo! and Google signed an agreement which would tap the Google engine to power searches made on yahoo.com.

In 2000, Yahoo became one of the first companies to implement a BizOps or business operations team.

Post dot-com bubble (2002–2005)
Yahoo! was one of the few surviving companies after the dot-com bubble burst. Nevertheless, on September 26, 2001, Yahoo! stock closed at an all-time low of $8.11.

Yahoo! formed partnerships with telecommunications and Internet providers to create content-rich broadband services to compete with AOL. For example, on June 3, 2002, SBC and Yahoo! launched a national co-branded dialup service. In July 2003, BT Openworld announced an alliance with Yahoo!
 On August 23, 2005, Yahoo! and Verizon launched an integrated DSL service.

In late 2002, Yahoo! began to bolster its search services by acquiring other search engines. In December 2002, Yahoo! acquired Inktomi. In February 2005, Yahoo! acquired Konfabulator and rebranded it Yahoo! Widgets, a desktop application, and in July 2003, it acquired Overture Services, Inc. and its subsidiaries AltaVista and AlltheWeb.  On February 18, 2004, Yahoo! dropped Google-powered results and returned to using its own technology to provide search results.

In March 2004, Yahoo! launched a paid inclusion program whereby commercial websites were guaranteed listings on the Yahoo! search engine after payment. This scheme was lucrative, but proved unpopular both with website marketers (who were reluctant to pay), and the public (who were unhappy about the paid-for listings being indistinguishable from other search results). As of October 2006, Paid Inclusion ceased to guarantee any commercial listing and only helped the paid inclusion customers, by crawling their site more often and by providing some statistics on the searches that led to the page and some additional smart links (provided by customers as feeds) below the actual url.

In 2004, in response to Google's release of Gmail, Yahoo! upgraded the storage of all free Yahoo! Mail accounts from 4 MB to 1 GB, and all Yahoo! Mail Plus accounts to 2 GB. On July 9, 2004, Yahoo! acquired e-mail provider Oddpost to add an Ajax interface to Yahoo! Mail Beta. Google also released Google Talk, a voice over IP and Yahoo Messenger and Yahoo message boards service, on August 24, 2005. On October 13, 2005, Yahoo! and Microsoft announced that Yahoo! and MSN Messenger would become interoperable. In 2007, Yahoo! took out the storage meters, thus allowing users unlimited storage.

Yahoo! continued acquiring companies to expand its range of services, particularly Web 2.0 services. Yahoo! Launch became Yahoo! Music in February 2005. On March 20, 2005, Yahoo! purchased photo sharing service Flickr. That same month, the company launched its blogging and social networking service Yahoo! 360°. In June 2005, Yahoo! acquired blo.gs, a service based on RSS feed aggregation. Yahoo! then bought online social event calendar Upcoming.org, in October 2005. Yahoo! acquired social bookmark site del.icio.us in December 2005 and then playlist sharing community webjay in January 2009.

Yahoo! (2006–2008)
Yahoo! Next is an incubation ground for future Yahoo! technologies currently in their beta testing phase, similar to Google Labs. It contains forums for Yahoo! users to give feedback to assist in the development of these future Yahoo! technologies.

In early 2006, Yahoo! offered users the chance to beta test a new version of the Yahoo! homepage. However, it currently only supports Internet Explorer and Mozilla Firefox. Users of other  browsers, such as Opera, have criticized Yahoo! for this move. Yahoo! says they intend to support additional browsers in the future.

On August 27, 2007, Yahoo! released a new version of Yahoo! Mail. It added Yahoo! Messenger integration (which included Windows Live Messenger due to the networks' federation) and free text messages (not necessarily free to the receiver) to mobile phones in the U.S., Canada, India, and the Philippines.

On January 29, 2008, Yahoo! announced that the company was laying off 1,000 employees, as the company had suffered severely in its inability to effectively compete with industry search leader Google. The cuts represented 7 percent of the company's workforce of 14,300.

In February 2008, Yahoo! acquired Cambridge, Massachusetts-based Maven Networks, a supplier of internet video players and video advertising tools, for approximately $160 million.

Yahoo! announced on November 17, 2008, that Yang would be stepping down as CEO.

On December 10, 2008, Yahoo! began laying off 1,520 employees around the world as the company managed its way through the global economic downturn.

Acquisition attempt by Microsoft
Microsoft and Yahoo! pursued merger discussions in 2005, 2006, and 2007, that were all ultimately unsuccessful. At the time, analysts were skeptical about the wisdom of a business combination by these two firms.

On February 1, 2008, after its friendly takeover offer was rebuffed by Yahoo!, Microsoft made an unsolicited takeover bid to buy Yahoo! for $44.6 billion in cash and stock. Days later, Yahoo! considered alternatives to the merger with Microsoft, including a merger with Internet giant Google or a potential transaction with News Corp. However, on February 11, 2008, Yahoo! decided to reject Microsoft's offer as "substantially undervaluing" Yahoo!'s brand, audience, investments, and growth prospects.

On February 22, two Detroit-based pension companies sued Yahoo! and its board of directors for allegedly breaching their duty to shareholders by opposing Microsoft's takeover bid and pursuing "value destructive" third-party deals. In early March, Google CEO Eric Schmidt went on record saying that he was concerned that a potential Microsoft-Yahoo! merger might hurt the internet by compromising its openness. The value of Microsoft's cash and stock offer declined with Microsoft's stock price, falling to $42.2 billion by April 4. On April 5, Microsoft CEO Steve Ballmer sent a letter to Yahoo!'s board of directors stating that if within three weeks they had not accepted the deal, Microsoft would approach shareholders directly in hopes of electing a new board and moving forward with merger talks (a hostile takeover). In response, Yahoo! stated on April 7 that they were not against a merger, but that they wanted a better offer. In addition, they stated that Microsoft's "aggressive" approach was worsening their relationship and the chances of a "friendly" merger. Later the same day, Yahoo! stated that the original $44.6 billion offer was not acceptable. Following this, there was considerable discussion of having Time Warner's AOL and Yahoo! merge, instead of the originally proposed Microsoft deal.

On May 3, 2008, Microsoft withdrew the offer. During a meeting between Ballmer and Yang, Microsoft had offered to raise its offer by $5 billion to $33 per share, while Yahoo! demanded $37 per share. One of Ballmer's lieutenants suggested that Yang would implement a poison pill to make the takeover as difficult as possible, saying "They are going to burn the furniture if we go hostile. They are going to destroy the place."

Analysts said that Yahoo!'s shares, which closed at $28.67 per share on May 2, were likely to drop below $25 per share and perhaps as low as $20 per share on May 5, which would put significant pressure on Yang to engineer a turnaround of the company. Some suggested that institutional investors would file lawsuits against Yahoo!'s board of directors for not acting in shareholder interest by refusing Microsoft's offer.

On May 5, 2008, following Microsoft's withdrawal, Yahoo!'s stock plunged some 15% lower to $23.02 per share in Monday trading and trimmed about $6 billion off of its market capitalization.

On June 12, 2008, Yahoo! announced that it had ended all talks with Microsoft about purchasing either part of the business (the search advertising business) or all of the company. Talks had taken place the previous weekend (June 8), during which Microsoft allegedly told Yahoo! that it was no longer interested in a purchase of the entire company at the price offered earlier – $33 per share. Also, on June 12, Yahoo! announced a non-exclusive search advertising alliance with Google. Upon this announcement, many executives and senior employees announced their plans to leave the company as it appeared they had lost confidence in Yahoo!'s strategies. According to market analysts, these pending departures impacted Wall Street's perception of the company.

On July 7, 2008, Microsoft said it would reconsider proposing another bid for Yahoo! if the company's nine directors were ousted at the annual meeting scheduled to be held on August 1, 2008. Microsoft believed it would be able to better negotiate with a new board.

Billionaire investor Carl Icahn, calling the current board irrational in its approach to talks with Microsoft, launched a proxy fight to replace Yahoo!'s board. On July 21, 2008, Yahoo! settled with Carl Icahn, agreeing to appoint him and two allies to an expanded board.

On November 20, 2008, almost 10 months after Microsoft's initial offer of $33 per share, Yahoo!'s stock (YHOO) dropped to a 52-week low, trading at only $8.94 per share.

On November 30, 2008, Microsoft offered to buy Yahoo!'s search business for $20 billion.

On July 29, 2009, it was announced in a 10-year deal that Microsoft would have full access to Yahoo!'s search engine to be used in future Microsoft projects for its search engine, Bing.
Under the deal, Microsoft was not required to pay any cash up front to Yahoo!.  The day after the deal was announced, Yahoo!'s share price declined more than 10% to $15.14 per share, about 60% lower than Microsoft's takeover bid a year earlier.

Carol Bartz era (2009–2011)
On January 13, 2009, Yahoo! appointed Carol Bartz, former executive chairman of Autodesk, as its new chief executive officer and a member of the board of directors.
Yahoo! tried to change its direction after chief executive Carol Bartz replaced co-founder Jerry Yang.

In July 2009, Microsoft and Yahoo! agreed to a deal that would see Yahoo!'s websites use both Microsoft's search technology and search advertising. Yahoo! in turn would become the sales team for banner advertising for both companies. While Microsoft would provide algorithmic search results, Yahoo! would control the presentation and personalization of results for searches on its pages.

On July 21, 2009, Yahoo! launched a new version of its front page, called Metro. The new page allowed users to customize it through the prominent "My Favorites" panel on the left side and integrate third-party web services and launch them within one page. 

On October 28, 2009, Bartz told PCWorld that she struggled with the question of what Yahoo! is when she took over as CEO in January 2009. After talking to many users in about 10 countries, she said, Yahoo! executives concluded that users consider it their "home on the Internet."

In September 2011, Bartz sent an email to Yahoo! employees saying she was removed from her position at Yahoo! by the company's chairman Roy Bostock via a phone call. CFO Tim Morse was named as Interim CEO of the company.

Scott Thompson period (2012)
On January 4, 2012, Scott Thompson, former President of PayPal, was named the new chief executive officer.

Employee layoffs
In early 2012, after the appointment of Scott Thompson as the new CEO, many rumors spread about large layoffs looming. Kara Swisher who covers Yahoo at All Things Digital reported that Yahoo's Chief Product Officer Blake Irving Resigned,
Andrei Broder, who was VP of computational advertising and chief scientist of the Advertising Product Group, as well as Jianchang (JC) Mao, who headed advertising sciences  left the company. This followed the departures of Yahoo! Labs head Prabhakar Raghavan who left for Google, and Raghu Ramakrishnan, who went to Microsoft.

On April 4, 2012, Yahoo announced a cut of 2,000 jobs or about 14 percent of 14,100 workers employed by Yahoo. Yahoo! said it will save around $375 million annually after the layoffs are completed at end of 2012.

Facebook patent lawsuit
On March 14, Yahoo! filed a lawsuit against Facebook over the alleged infringement of 10 patents. Facebook responded by counter suing Yahoo!.

Reorganization
In an email memo sent to employees in April 2012, Scott Thompson re-iterated his view that customers should come first at Yahoo. He defined customers as both users and advertisers. He also completely re-organized the company. The reorganization took effect on May 1, 2012 and included operations in three major groups for Yahoo! —  Consumer, Regions and Technology.

The Consumer group has three groups: Media, Connections, and Commerce. The customers of this group are the users of Yahoo!.

The Regions group  operates three regions: • Americas, APAC, and EMEA. The customers of this group are the advertisers of Yahoo!.

The Technology group includes Core Platforms, and  Central Technology. It provides technology and support to the other two major groups.

The Corporate group (Finance, Legal, and HR) remains unchanged and continues to support the new groups.

Thompson's College degree controversy
On May 3, 2012, news broke out that Thompson's biography at Yahoo was incorrect. The CEO's biography stated that he held a dual accounting and computer science degree from Stonehill College, whereas investigation revealed that Thompson's degree was solely in accounting, and not in Computer Science. The revelation came from  Dan Loeb, founder of Third Point LLC, which held 5.8% of Yahoo! stock, who had been trying to gain seats on the board of directors of Yahoo!

In response to the  crisis, Yahoo!'s board of directors formed a three-member committee to review Thompson's academic credentials and the vetting process that preceded his selection as CEO. The review committee's chairman is Alfred Amoroso, who joined Yahoo!'s board in February 2012. The other directors on the panel are John Hayes  and Thomas McInerney, who both joined in April 2012. The committee retained Terry Bird as independent counsel.

Thompson replaced by Ross Levinsohn (interim)
On May 13, 2012, Scott Thompson was replaced by Ross Levinsohn as the company's interim CEO. In June 2012, Yahoo! hired former Google director Michael G. Barrett as its Chief Revenue Officer.

Marissa Mayer era (2012–2017)

On July 16, 2012, former Google executive and Walmart corporate director Marissa Mayer was named as Yahoo! CEO and President, and youngest CEO of a Fortune 500 company.

On May 19, 2013, the Wall Street Journal reported that Yahoo's board had approved an all-cash deal to purchase the six-year-old blogging website Tumblr.  The announcement reportedly signifies a changing trend in the technology industry, as large corporations like Yahoo, Facebook, and Google acquire start-up Internet companies that generate low amounts of revenue as a way in which to connect with sizeable, fast-growing online communities. The Wall Street Journal stated that the purchase of Tumblr would satisfy the company's need for "a thriving social-networking and communications hub." Yahoo will pay US$1.1 billion for Tumblr, and the company's CEO and founder David Karp will remain a large shareholder.

The revamp of the Yahoo-owned photography service Flickr was launched in Times Square, New York, U.S. on May 20, 2013 in an event that was attended by the city's mayor and a large contingency of journalists. Eleven billboards in Times Square advertised the website's new tagline "biggr, spectaculr, wherevr." as part of the launch and Yahoo stated that it will provide Flickr users with a free terabyte of storage. The official announcement of the Tumblr acquisition was also included in the May 20 event.

The media reported on Yahoo!'s interest in the video streaming site Hulu on May 26, 2013. Under Mayer's leadership, Yahoo!'s bid is worth between US$600 and $800 million, as a variety of options that consist of different circumstances were put forward by the company. As of May 28, 2013, Yahoo!'s videos attract 45 million unique visitors a month, while Hulu has 24 million visitors—the combination of the two audiences can place Yahoo! in the second-most popular position after Google and its subsidiary YouTube.

In July 2013, Yahoo Inc acquired Qwiki for $50 million. 

On August 2, 2013 Yahoo Inc announced the acquisition of social web browser concern RockMelt. With the acquisition, RockMelt team, including the concern's CEO Eric Vishria and CTO Tim Howes will be the part of Yahoo team. As a result, all the RockMelt apps and existing web services will go off from August 31.

On August 7, 2013, at around midnight EDT, Yahoo! announced that it will be introducing the final version of the new logo on 5 September 2013 at 4:00 a.m. UTC. To mark the occasion, the company launched a "30 days of change" campaign that involved releasing a variation of the logo on each of the 30 days leading up to the revelation date.

Data collated by comScore during July 2013 revealed that more people in the U.S. visited Yahoo! websites during the month in comparison to Google websites—the occasion was the first time that Yahoo! outperformed Google since 2011. The data did not incorporate visit statistics for the Yahoo!-owned Tumblr website or mobile phone usage.

On February 11, 2014, Yahoo! has acquired a social diary company named Wander.

On February 13, 2014, Yahoo! acquired Distill, a technical recruiting company.

On September 22, 2016, Yahoo disclosed a data breach in which hackers stole information associated with at least 500 million user accounts in late 2014. According to the BBC, this was the largest technical breach reported to date. Specific details of material taken include names, email addresses, telephone numbers, encrypted or unencrypted security questions and answers, dates of birth, and encrypted passwords. The breach used manufactured web cookies to falsify login credentials, allowing hackers to gain access to any account without a password. On December 14, 2016 a separate data breach, occurring earlier around August 2013 was reported. This breach affected over 1 billion user accounts and is again considered the largest discovered in the history of the Internet.

On January 9, 2017, Yahoo! CEO Marissa Mayer announces she will step down from Yahoo's board of directors if its sale to Verizon, of $4.5 billion,  goes through. She also announced that when that deal closed Yahoo! will rename itself to Altaba.

References

External links
 The History of Yahoo! – How It All Started ...

History of Silicon Valley
Yahoo!
Yahoo!
Yahoo!